HMS Wryneck was an Admiralty W-class destroyer of the Royal Navy, which was sunk during the Battle of Greece on 27 April 1941.

Construction
The ship was ordered on 16 December 1916 from Palmers Shipbuilding and Iron Company at Jarrow in the 10th Order of the 1916–17 Programme. She was laid down in April 1917, launched on 13 May 1918, and completed on the last day of the war, 11 November 1918.

Service history
After being accepted in service Wryneck took part in operations in the Baltic against the Bolsheviks. Sailors of the ship took part in the Royal Navy mutiny of 1919. She was part of the 5th Destroyer Flotilla in the Atlantic Fleet in 1921, which was transferred to the Mediterranean Fleet in 1925 as the 1st Destroyer Flotilla.

Wryneck was put into Reserve during the economic crisis of the 1930s and laid up in Gibraltar. In 1938 she was selected for WAIR conversion to a fast escort ship at Gibraltar Dockyard. The work began in September 1939 and was not completed until March 1940. In April 1940, after sea trials, Wryneck was recommissioned for service with the new pennant number L04, and assigned to convoy defence duty based at Alexandria. In December she was detached to support military operations against the Italian army in Egypt.

In January 1941 she resumed convoy defence duties, and in March formed part of the escort of military convoys taking British and Commonwealth troops to Greece as part of "Operation Lustre". In April, with the fall of Greece, Wryneck returned to help the evacuation of Allied troops.

Loss

On the morning of 27 April she was in Souda Bay when a convoy led by the cruiser  evacuating troops from Nauplia in the Peloponnese came under air attack in the Argolic Gulf. By the time Vendetta, Waterhen and Wryneck reached the convoy, the Dutch troop ship  had been disabled and left behind and the destroyer  had been ordered to stay and assist.

At 08:15 Diamond reported that she was still rescuing survivors and still under air attack. By then three destroyers had reinforced the convoy so Calcutta sent Wryneck to assist Diamond. Slamat was afire from stem to stern when Diamond fired a torpedo that sank her in a coup de grâce. Diamond reported at 09:25 that she had rescued most of the survivors and was proceeding to Souda Bay. An hour later Wryneck signalled a request for aircraft cover.

At about 13:15, an air attack by German Messerschmitt Bf 109 fighters and Junkers Ju 88 bombers sank both destroyers within minutes. Wryneck launched her whaler, and each destroyer launched her three Carley floats. Survivors in the whaler set off east past Cape Maleas, towing two Carley floats and their occupants. In the evening the wind increased, causing the floats to strike the boat, so Waldron reluctantly cast them adrift.

After 1900 hrs on 27 April the Vice Admiral, Light Forces, Henry Pridham-Wippell, became concerned that Diamond had not returned to Souda Bay and was not answering radio signals. Wryneck had been ordered to keep radio silence so no attempt was made to radio her. Pridham-Wippell sent the destroyer  to the position where Slamat had been lost. She found 14 survivors in two Carley floats that night, more floats and another four survivors in the morning, and took the survivors to Crete.

The last living survivor from Slamat, Royal Army Service Corps veteran George Dexter, states that after Wryneck was sunk he and three other men were rescued by the cruiser .

24 survivors in Wrynecks whaler, one of them severely wounded, reached Crete in three stages. There they were met by the passengers of a caïque full of Greek refugees and British soldiers evacuated from Piraeus, who were sheltering by day and sailing only by night to avoid detection. They too had been bombed when another caïque carrying them, Irene, had been sighted near Monemvasia (Porto Gerakas) in the daytime when they were resting ashore. Embarking on another hastily bought caique, they sailed on to the Ananes.

Among the passengers were the historian and SOE operative Nicholas Hammond, Major Ian Pirie the leader of the British expedition to Greece together with expatriate and high-ranking SOE operative David Pawson, as well as four Australian privates. The caïque's captain, George Vergos, was also involved in SOE work and was a decorated veteran (OBE) of the Royal Navy from the First World War, also fleeing Greece with his extended family and some other Greeks. Pirie and Pawson together with Dennis Hamson were now charged with evacuating an unknown amount of bullion from the British Embassy in Athens, all lost with the Irene.

In the evening everyone left Ananes and headed south for Crete, with most people in the caïque and four being towed in the whaler. Five of the women and children were placed in a skiff on deck with a tarpaulin over them as the sea spray from a strong southerly wind was washing the deck. The next day all 46 people reached Souda Bay whose jetty was at the time under heavy aerial bombardment. They were making very slow progress in the small caïque so a faster landing craft was sent out to tow them to safety.

Notes

Bibliography

 
 
 
 
 
 
 
 
 
 
 
 
 
 
 
 
 

 

1918 ships
Maritime incidents in April 1941
Shipwrecks of Greece
Ships built on the River Tyne
V and W-class destroyers of the Royal Navy
World War II destroyers of the United Kingdom
World War II shipwrecks in the Mediterranean Sea